Cleave Simpson, Jr. is an American politician from Alamosa, Colorado. A Republican, Simpson represents Colorado State Senate District 6, which includes all or parts of Alamosa, Archuleta, Conejos, Costilla, Dolores, La Plata, Mineral, Montezuma, Montrose, Ouray, Rio Grande, Saguache, San Juan and San Miguel counties, including the communities of Durango, Alamosa, Cortez, Monte Vista, and Bayfield. Prior to the implementation of 2020 redistricting in 2023, Simpson represented the former Colorado State Senate District 35, a geographically-large district which encompassed parts of Pueblo County, and all of Alamosa County, Baca County, Bent County, Conejos County, Costilla County, Crowley County, Custer County, Huerfano County, Kiowa County, Las Animas County, Mineral County, Otero County, Prowers County, Rio Grande County, and Saguache County in southern Colorado.

Background
Simpson is the general manager of the Rio Grande Water Conservation District and also served on the Adams State University Board of Trustees from 2015 to 2020. A native of the San Luis Valley, he is a fourth-generation farmer and rancher there. He graduated from the Colorado School of Mines in 1984.

Election
Colorado's 35th Senate district: In the 2020 Republican primary election, Simpson ran unopposed. In the 2020 general election, Simpson defeated his Democratic Party opponent, winning 60.12% of the vote.

References

External links
Campaign website 
Legislative website

Republican Party Colorado state senators
21st-century American politicians
Living people
People from Alamosa, Colorado
Colorado School of Mines alumni
Year of birth missing (living people)